Charles Spiro (January 1, 1850 - December 17, 1933) was an American inventor and an attorney who held 200 patents and patented Bar-Lock, Visigraph, Columbia and Columbia Music typewriters and helped develop the Gourland typewriter, among others. Spiro was born and died in New York City. He gave up his law profession after nine years and focused on refining his typewriters. He was also president of C. Spiro Manufacturing Company of Yonkers.

References

External links 

 Columbia Music Typewriter, The Antikey Chop Typewriter Collection
 Gourland Typewriter, The Antikey Chop Typewriter Collection
 Visigraph Typewriter, The Antikey Chop Typewriter Collection
 Bar - Lock Typewriters, The Antikey Chop Typewriter Collection
 
 
 

1850 births
1933 deaths
19th-century American inventors
20th-century American inventors
American lawyers